Qabeli palaw is a variety of pilaf made in Afghanistan. It consists of steamed rice mixed with raisins, carrots, and beef or lamb. There exists different variations depending on the region.

Serving
Qabeli palaw is considered a festive and important dish due to the price and quality of the ingredients as well as its tradition of being Afghanistan's national dish. The dish is traditionally placed in the center of the meal with other foods making up the rest of the perimeter.

See also
 Osh (food)
 List of lamb dishes

References

External links
Qabili Palao – Margarita's International Recipes

Rice dishes
Afghan cuisine
Lamb dishes
National dishes